Eukaryotic translation initiation factor 1 (eIF1) is a protein that in humans is encoded by the EIF1 gene. It is related to yeast SUI1.

eIF1 interacts with the eukaryotic small (40S) ribosomal subunit and eIF3, and is a component of the 43S preinitiation complex (PIC). eIF1 and eIF1A bind cooperatively to the 40S to stabilize an "open" conformation of the preinitiation complex (PIC) during eukaryotic translation initiation. eIF1 binds to a region near the ribosomal P-site in the 40S subunit and functions in a manner similar to the structurally related bacterial counterpart IF3.

Structure 
eIF1 is a conserved translation protein in all eukaryotic cells that is responsible for the investigation of codon-anticodon mismatches during the initiation of translation. In order to determine the structure of human eIF1, an experiment with N-terminal His tag and eIF1 are conducted via using NMR spectroscopy. Scientists have discovered a binding site by generating yeast mutation and study the neighbor conserved residues located in the same region. GST pull-down experiments has shown that eIF1 binds precisely to the p110 subunit of eIF3 as a result explaining eIF1 recruiting.

Function 
The function of eIf1 has some hidden aspects. However, in all eukaryotic cells initiation of mRNA translation starts with scanning via ribosomal 43S preinitiation complexes starting from the 5’ end of the mRNA. Next, induction via eIF1 and eIF1A are needed to disclose the conformation of the 40S subunit in order to induce DEAD-box RNA helicase eIF4A, its cofactor eIF4B, and eIF4G activity.

See also 

 Eukaryotic initiation factors

References

Further reading

External links 
 
 
 Cap-dependent translation initiation from Nature Reviews Microbiology. A good image and overview of the function of initiation factors